Jung Hun-cheol (January 8, 1992 – January 25, 2021), better known by his stage name Iron (Hangul: 아이언), was a South Korean rapper. He was a contestant on Show Me the Money 3. He released his first album, Rock Bottom, on September 9, 2016.

Discography

Studio albums

Singles

Legal issues
In November 2016, Iron was convicted of smoking marijuana and received a sentence of eight months, suspended for two years.

In November 2018, he was convicted of multiple counts of assault against his ex-girlfriend. It was stated that he had hit her in the face during sex, causing fractures; he also strangled her when she attempted to end the relationship, as well as injuring himself with a kitchen knife and threatening to blame it on her. He then revealed her identity in media interviews during the court process and publicly defamed her, calling her a masochist and denying any wrongdoing.

In December 2020, he was again placed under arrest for assault with a baseball bat against his roommate, who was a minor at the time.

Death
On January 25, 2021 at 10.25am KST, a security guard discovered Iron lying in a flowerbed outside an apartment complex, bleeding. He was taken to a local hospital, but was pronounced dead on arrival. An investigation revealed the apartment complex was not the residence of Iron, though the reason for this was undisclosed.  Foul play and homicide were ruled out, and at the request of the family, a post-mortem was not carried out.

References

1992 births
2021 deaths
21st-century South Korean male singers
21st-century rappers
South Korean hip hop singers
South Korean male rappers
Show Me the Money (South Korean TV series) contestants